The Romanian Orthodox Cathedral or specifically Cathedral of Lord's Ascension in Vršac is a cathedral in Vršac, Vojvodina, Serbia, consecrated in 1912.

References

External links
 Sărbătoare românească la hramul catedralei din Vârşeţ

Romanian Orthodox churches in Serbia
Vršac
Eastern Orthodox cathedrals in Serbia
Cathedrals in Vojvodina
Churches completed in 1912
1912 establishments in Austria-Hungary
Romanian Orthodox cathedrals